The  Diet of Hungary or originally: Parlamentum Publicum / Parlamentum Generale became the supreme legislative institution in the medieval kingdom of Hungary from the 1290s, and in its successor states, Royal Hungary and the Habsburg kingdom of Hungary throughout the Early Modern period until the end of World War II. The name of the legislative body was originally "Parlamentum" during the Middle Ages, the "Diet" expression gained mostly in the Early Modern period. It convened at regular intervals with interruptions from the 12th century to 1918, and again until 1946.

The articles of the 1790 diet set out that the diet should meet at least once every 3 years, but, since the diet was called by the Habsburg monarchy, this promise was not kept on several occasions thereafter. As a result of the Austro-Hungarian Compromise, it was reconstituted in 1867.

The Latin term Natio Hungarica ("Hungarian nation") was used to designate the elite which had participation in the medieval and early modern era political life of Hungary (at local level as members of the assemblies of the counties, or nation-wide level as members of the Parliaments). The members of the parliament consisted the envoys of the Roman Catholic Clergy, the elected envoys of the nobility from the county assemblies of the Kingdom, and the envoys of cities who were elected by the people of the Royal Free Cities) regardless of mother tongue or ethnicity of the person. Natio Hungarica was a geographic, institutional and juridico-political category.

Development

Some researchers have traced the roots of the Hungarian institution of national assemblies as far back as the 11th century. This based on documentary evidence that, on certain "important occasions" under the reigns of King Ladislaus I and King Coloman "the Learned", assemblies were held on a national scale where both ecclesiastic and secular dignitaries made appearances.
The first exact written mention of the word "parlamentum" (Parliament) for the nationwide assembly originated during the reign of King Andrew II in the Golden Bull of 1222, which reaffirmed the rights of the smaller nobles of the old and new classes of royal servants (servientes regis) against both the crown and the magnates, and to defend the rights of the whole nation against the crown by restricting the powers of the latter in certain fields and legalizing refusal to obey its unlawful/unconstitutional commands (the "ius resistendi").
The lesser nobles also began to present Andrew with grievances, a practice that evolved into the institution of the Hungarian Diet.

An institutionalized Hungarian parliament emerged during the 14th and 15th centuries. Beginning under King Charles I, continuing under subsequent kings through into the reign of King Matthias I, the Diet was essentially convened by the king. However, under the rule of heavy handed kings like Louis the Great and during reign of the early absolutist Matthias Corvinus the parliaments were often convened to announce the royal decisions, and had no significant power of its own. Since the reign of the Jagiellonian dynasty, the parliament has regained most of its former power.

In 1492 the Diet limited all serfs' freedom of movement and greatly expanded their obligations while at the same time only a few peasant families were prospering because of increased cattle exports to the West. Rural discontent boiled over in 1514 when well-armed peasants preparing for a crusade against Turks rose up under György Dózsa. Shocked by the peasant revolt, the Diet of 1514 passed laws that condemned the serfs to eternal bondage and increased their work obligations still further.

When King Vladislaus II died in 1516, a royal council appointed by the Diet ruled the country in the name of his ten-year-old son, King Louis II (1516–26).

In 1608 the Diet divided into two houses: House of Magnates and House of Representatives. From next Diet in 1609, the members of the House of Representatives elected by nobles of the Counties, by civics of the Free Royal Cities and by members of the Cathedral chapters.

List of legislative sessions

Early legislative assemblies, 11th century

Early legislative assemblies 12th century

Parliamentary sessions of Kingdom of Hungary, 13th century

Parliamentary sessions of Kingdom of Hungary, 14th century

Parliamentary sessions of Kingdom of Hungary, 15th century

Parliamentary sessions of Kingdom of Hungary, 16th century

Diets of Royal Hungary – 1527–1699 (the most important diets)

Diets during the Habsburg ruled Kingdom of Hungary (1700–1867)

Re-establishment 1867 
In the course of the Hungarian Revolution of 1848 a diet was called at Pest that was dismissed by decree of Emperor Ferdinand I of Austria in October; the next year a Hungarian assembly met at the Protestant Great Church of Debrecen, which declared the new Emperor Franz Joseph deposed and elected Lajos Kossuth regent-president. The revolution was finally suppressed by Austrian troops under General Julius Jacob von Haynau and the assembly dissolved.

The Habsburgs again approached the Hungarian estates after the disastrous defeat at the 1859 Battle of Solferino and the loss of Lombardy. In 1860 Emperor Franz Joseph issued the October Diploma, which provided a national Reichsrat assembly formed by delegates deputed by the Landtage diets of the Austrian crown lands, followed by the February Patent of 1861, promising the implementation of a bicameral legislature. The Hungarian magnates however rejected being governed from Vienna and insisted on a parliamentary assembly with comprehensive autonomy in Hungarian affairs. The negotiations failed, predominantly due to the tough stance of Austrian Minister-President Anton von Schmerling.

Finally in the course of the Austro-Hungarian Compromise of 1867, the emperor appointed Gyula Andrássy Hungarian minister-president and the re-established national assembly convened on 27 February.

The legislative power was vested in this parliament, consisting of two houses: an upper house titled the Főrendiház (House of Magnates), and a lower house titled the Képviselőház (House of Representatives). From 1902 on parliament assembled in the Hungarian Parliament Building on the Danube in Budapest.

House of Magnates 

The House of Magnates (Főrendiház) was, like the current British House of Lords, composed of hereditaries, ecclesiastics, and, unlike the House of Lords, deputized representatives from autonomous regions (similar to Resident Commissioners of United States territories). The House had no fixed membership size, as anyone who met the qualifications could sit in it. The official list:
 Princes of the royal house who have attained their majority (16 in 1904)
 Hereditary peers who paid at least 3000 florins a year land tax (237 in 1904) (at its 1896 exchange rate, £1 was worth 12 florins, so this comes to £250)
 High dignitaries of the Roman Catholic and Eastern Orthodox churches (42 in 1904)
 Representatives of the Protestant confessions (13 in 1904)
 Life peers appointed by the Crown, not exceeding 50 in number, and life peers elected by the house itself (73 altogether in 1904)
 Various state dignitaries and high judges (19 in 1904)
 Three delegates of Croatia-Slavonia

See also List of speakers of the House of Magnates

House of Representatives 
Since the beginning until the 1848 revolution in Hungary, the members of the house of representatives were elected noble envoys from the members of the counties of the kingdom of Hungary, the elected envoys of the free royal cities of the kingdom, and the envoys of the lower clergy.

The House of Representatives (Képviselőház ) consisted of members elected, under the Electoral Law of 1874, by a complicated franchise based upon property, taxation, profession or official position, and ancestral privileges. The House consisted of 453 members, of which 413 were deputies elected in Hungary and 40 delegates of Croatia-Slavonia sent by the parliament of that Kingdom. Their terms were for five years and were remunerated.

The Encyclopædia Britannica Eleventh Edition considered the franchise "probably the most illiberal in Europe". The working classes were wholly unrepresented in the parliament, only 6% of them, and 13% of the small trading class, possessing the franchise, which was only enjoyed by 6% of the entire population.

The parliament was summoned annually by the king in Budapest. While the official language was Hungarian, the delegates of Croatia-Slavonia were allowed to use the Croatian language in the proceedings. The Hungarian parliament had the power to legislate on all matters concerning Hungary, but for Croatia-Slavonia only on matters which it shared with Hungary. Executive power was vested in a cabinet responsible to it, consisting of ten ministers, including: the president of the council, the minister for Croatia-Slavonia, a minister ad latum, and the ministers of the interior, of national defence, of education and public worship, of finance, of agriculture, of industry and commerce, and of justice. The King had the power to veto all legislation passed by the Diet and also to dissolve it and call new elections. Additionally, before any bill could be presented to the Diet, the Emperor-King had to give his Royal Assent. All this shows that the Head of State still had huge power, which however he chose not to use in order to give the Hungarians more control over their own affairs.

According to Randalph Braham, the increasingly illiberal nature of the Diet, leading into World War II, over the period from 1867 and 1944, continues to be a sticking point in regional cultural and political conflicts to this day. The population fluctuated from 6.7% having the franchise in 1848, to 5% having the franchise in 1874, reaching a peak of 8% at the beginning of World War I, with significant police and other pressure on the vote to remain highly partisan. By the start of World War I in 1910, despite the region having a population that was approximately 54.5% magyar 16.1% Romanian and 10.6% Slovak, 405 out of 413 representatives were of Hungarian descent, with 5 Romanian and 3 Slovak representatives making up the difference.

The Austro-Hungarian compromise and its supporting liberal parliamentary parties remained bitterly unpopular among the ethnic Hungarian voters, and the continuous successes of these pro-compromise liberal parties in the Hungarian parliamentary elections caused long lasting frustration among Hungarian voters. The ethnic minorities had the key role in the political maintenance of the Austro-Hungarian Compromise in Hungary, because they were able to vote the pro-compromise liberal parties into the position of the majority/ruling parties of the Hungarian parliament. The pro-compromise liberal parties were the most popular among ethnic minority voters, however i.e. the Slovak, Serb and Romanian minority parties remained unpopular among their own ethnic minority voters. The coalitions of Hungarian nationalist parties – which were supported by the overwhelming majority of ethnic Hungarian voters – always remained in the opposition, with the exception of the 1906–1910 period, where the Hungarian-supported nationalist parties were able to form a government.

See also
 Imperial Council (Austria)
 Diet of Dalmatia
Indigenat (Hungary)

Further reading
Free English language book about the history of parliamentarism in Hungary (Content: 22 pages, PDF format, link to the book)

References 

 .
  Some material from this work is included directly above.

Kingdom of Hungary
Political history of Hungary
Historical legislatures
National Assembly (Hungary)
Legislatures of Austria-Hungary

fr:Diète de Hongrie